Symphlebia dorisca is a moth in the subfamily Arctiinae. It was described by Schaus in 1933. It is found in Colombia.

References

External links 
 

Moths described in 1933
dorisca